Police Volleyball ( طائرة السد) is a professional Volleyball team based in Doha, Qatar. It competes in the Qatari Volleyball League.

Honors
1 official championships.

Domestic
 Qatar Volleyball League

 Winners (4): 2017, 2019, 2020, 2021

QVA Cup

 Winners (1): 2008

International
 GCC Club Championship
 Runners-up:2015

References

Volleyball clubs established in 2007
Qatari volleyball clubs
Sports clubs in Doha